Eriogonum dasyanthemum is a species of wild buckwheat known by the common name chaparral buckwheat. This plant is endemic to California where it is limited to the Northern Coast Ranges, but it is quite common in its native range.

Description
It is an annual herb with spindly gray to reddish fuzzy stems that grow to a maximum of 60 centimeters in height. Leaves are basal, small, and less than two centimeters long. The plant produces tiny clusters of pink flowers on its spreading branches. Each flower cluster is less than a centimeter wide. Flowers bloom May to October.

References

External links
Jepson Manual Treatment - Eriogonum dasyanthemum
Eriogonum dasyanthemum - Photo gallery

dasyanthemum
Endemic flora of California
Natural history of the California Coast Ranges
Flora without expected TNC conservation status